Live at the Public Theater (New York 1980) is a live album by jazz composer, arranger, conductor and pianist Gil Evans recorded in New York in 1980 by Evans with an orchestra featuring Arthur Blythe, Hamiet Bluiett, and Lew Soloff and originally released from Japanese Trio label in two volumes. Integrated version was first released in 1986 from Japanese Crown Record's Break Time label as 2xCDs album, and one track was added in the release from Japanese Venus Records label of 1993.

Reception
AllMusic awarded the first volume 3 stars stating "One of arranger Gil Evans's main talents was his ability to fuse diverse, unique performers into a unified ensemble. He accomplishes that... even if his presence is felt more than heard". They gave the second volume 2½ stars noting " Although the end results do not quite live up to the potential of this unique ensemble, there are plenty of colorful moments".

Track listing
All compositions by Gil Evans except where noted.

Volume 1 (disc 1):
 "Anita's Dance" – 17:11   
 "Jelly Roll" – 4:48   
 "Alyrio" – 3:14   
 "Variation on the Misery" – 6:20   
 "Gone, Gone, Gone" (George Gershwin) – 7:51 
 "Up from the Skies" (Jimi Hendrix) – 4:19  
Volume 2 (disc 2):
 "Copenhagen Sight" – 6:27   
 "Zee Zee" – 11:02   
 "Sirhan's Blues" (John Benson Brooks) – 7:41   
 "Stone Free" (Hendrix) – 14:14   
 "Orange Was the Color of Her Dress, Then Blue Silk" (Charles Mingus) – 9:33
 "Listen To The Silence" – 8:57 – added in disc 2 of Venus Records [1993] version and after releases

Personnel
Gil Evans – electric piano, arranger, conductor
Lew Soloff, Jon Faddis, Hannibal Marvin Peterson – trumpet
John Clark – French horn 
George Lewis – trombone
Arthur Blythe – alto saxophone, soprano saxophone  
Hamiet Bluiett – baritone saxophone, alto flute  
Dave Bargeron – trombone, tuba  
Masabumi Kikuchi – synthesizer, organ
Pete Levin – synthesizer, minimoog, clavinet  
Tim Landers – electric bass  
Billy Cobham – drums  
Alyrio Lima – percussion

References

1981 live albums
Gil Evans live albums
Albums arranged by Gil Evans